Thanedar Wala is a game reserve and wetland Ramsar site, located  east of Lakki, Lakki Marwat District (formerly in Bannu District), North-West Frontier Province, Pakistan. It supports wintering great egret, ruddy shelduck, common teal, mallard, northern shoveller, common pochard and ferruginous duck. Collared pratincole and little tern breed on the reserve.

Thanedar Wala was designated a Ramsar site on July 23, 1976. A monitoring mission in May 1990 recommended that it be retained on the Ramsar List.

References

External links
 Pakistan Wetlands programme

Ramsar sites in Pakistan
Lakki Marwat District
Protected areas of Khyber Pakhtunkhwa